The Latin American Faculty of Social Sciences (or FLACSO) is a graduate-only university and inter-governmental autonomous organization for Latin America dedicated to research, teaching and spreading of social sciences. Headquartered in Costa Rica, it has several campuses and centers spread across Latin America.

It was created on April 17, 1957, following a UNESCO initiative at the Latin American Conference on Social Sciences in Rio de Janeiro. Its goal was to promote academic research and development in the region.

Its membership is open to Latin American and Caribbean countries that subscribe to the FLACSO agreement. Current members include: Argentina, Bolivia, Brazil, Costa Rica, Cuba, Chile, Ecuador, Honduras, Guatemala, Mexico, Nicaragua, Panama, Dominican Republic, Suriname and Uruguay.

Josette Altmann Borbón, a historian and former First Lady of Costa Rica, was elected Secretary General of FLACSO in June 2016. She succeeded Manuel González on July 31, 2016.

Notable people

Carmen Diana Deere
Ricardo Lagos Escobar
Enrique Correa
Fernando Henrique Cardoso
Hilda Herzer
Amparo Menendez-Carrion
Juan Carlos Portantiero
Suzana Prates
Paolina Vercoutere - Governor of Imbabura Province

References

External links
FLACSO In Spanish.
Flacso - Argentina In Spanish
Flacso - Brasil In Portuguese
Flacso - Chile In Spanish
Flacso - Costa Rica In Spanish
Flacso - Cuba In Spanish
Flacso - Ecuador In Spanish
Flacso - El Salvador In Spanish
Flacso - Guatemala In Spanish
Flacso - México In Spanish
Flacso - Panamá In Spanish
Flacso - Paraguay In Spanish
Flacso - República Dominicana In Spanish
Flacso - Uruguay In Spanish

Latin American Social Sciences Institute
Social science institutes
Members of the International Science Council